The Nikon S-mount is a type of interchangeable lens mount used by a series of Nikon 35mm rangefinder cameras (Nikon I, Nikon M, Nikon S, Nikon S2, Nikon SP, Nikon S3, Nikon S4). The lenses were sold under the name Nikkor.

The mount was a copy of the Zeiss Ikon Contax rangefinder mount, however, small differences between the two mean that although Zeiss wide-angle lenses can be used on the Nikon cameras and vice versa, the longer lenses (50 mm and above), if used, will not be able to focus at both close range and infinity. 

Nikon made a small number of longer focal length lenses specifically designed to focus properly when mounted on a Contax. These were the 85mm, 105mm, and 135mm lenses. Each was marked with a "C" on the side of the lens barrel. This is not to be confused with a "C" mark used as a suffix to the serial number. Some early Nikkors used this mark to denote that the lenses were coated.

The mount itself has two bayonets, one inside the camera and another outside. Lenses that use the bayonet inside the camera need have no focusing helicoid built into the lens barrel. As a consequence, the 5 cm f/1.4 lens that was normally sold with the body is extremely small (about the size of a golf ball) since the lens contains the optics only. Focusing of such lenses could be done by rotating the toothed wheel on the top front of the camera body or by rotating the lens barrel itself (the distance scale is on the camera body). The external bayonet is used to mount longer and heavier lenses where the built-in helicoid would not be strong enough to rotate the lens barrel. Such lenses are focused using a focusing ring and distance scale on the lens just like typical SLR lenses (the distance scale on the camera body will be covered by the lens flange and thus not visible).

Nikon produced a very large range of Nikkor lenses for these cameras with focal lengths from 21mm to 1000mm. Several other manufacturers including Fuji (now Fujifilm), Komura and Zunow made S-mount lenses at the time of which the Zunow 5 cm f/1.1 lens is a keenly sought after collectors item. In 2002, Cosina Voigtländer manufactured a camera (the Bessa R2S) as well as several lenses for the Nikon S-mount.

Further reading
Rotoloni, Robert, Nikon Rangefinder Camera, 1983, Hove, East Sussex, Hove Collectors Books.

References

External links
 W-NIKKOR 3.5cm f/1.8 "NIKKOR Club Quarterly" article about the design of about what was at the time the fastest wide-angle lens in the world.
 Stephen Gandy's site  Brief descriptions of Nikon S-mount cameras and Nikkor / Voigtlander lenses in S-mount.

Lens mounts
 
135 film cameras
S
S